{{Infobox film
| name           = Thodi Thodi si Manmaniyan
| image          = File:New_Poster_of_Thodi_Thodi_Si_Manmaaniyan.jpg
| alt            = 
| caption        = Theatrical release poster
| director       = Aditya Sarpotdar
| producer       = Satish Kumar  Rohandeep singh 
| screenplay     = Ajinkya Kishore  Param Kalra Amjad Khan 
 Dialogue:  Ajinkya Kishore| story          = Param Karla
Amjad Khan
Legal Advisors    = RB& Associates Rohit Beaspal
| starring       = Shrenu Parikh Arsh Sehrawat Shilpa Tulaskar Mukesh Tiwari Rahul Raj MalhotraKuldeep Sarin
| music          = Troy ArifAjay Vas
| cinematography = Milind Jog
| editing        = Faisal khan Mahadik
| studio         = NH 8 Production  Jumping Tomato Marketing Pvt Ltd  
| released       = 
| country        = India
| language       = Hindi
| native_name      = 
}}Thodi Thodi si Manmaaniyan''' is a Hindi film starring Shrenu Parikh, Arsh Sehrawat, Mukesh Tiwari and is directed by Aditya Sarpotdar Written by Param Kalra and Amjad Khan.

Cast
 Arsh Sehrawat as Siddharth Kaul
 Shrenu Parikh as Neha Datta 
 Shilpa Tulaskar as Saroj Deep Kaul
 Mukesh Tiwari  as Ajay Kaul
 Rahul Raj Malhotra  as Sufi
 Kuldeep Sarin as Ram Sharan Jha

Plot

Siddharth Kaul, a young boy is brought up by his single mother with dreams of settling abroad. Being a part of a rock band "Antriksha"; Siddharth participates in a contest which changes his life completely. Not only that, he meets Neha Datta, a folk singer and a social activist and gets smitten by her ideologies. In the midst of all this, he comes face to face with his father’s death.
A short part of shooting was done in Jaurasi village of Tauru town, Haryana.

Will Siddharth be able to come across the truth? Will he realize his passion, discover himself or will his mother convince him to let go off his past?

Soundtrack

Troy Arif & Ajay Vas are the music composers while Raghav Dutt & Prerna Sahetia are the lyricists. The first track in the album Meherbaan has been sung by Shekhar Ravjiani and Shalmali Kholgade. Tu Bas Chal Yahan has a fusion feel and Nikhil D’souza and Prerna Sahetia performed this song. The title track is sung by Nikhil D’souza. Banjarey and Taarashta Main have voices by Yasser Desai and Siddharth Basrur respectively.

Accolades

References

External links
 
 

2017 films
2010s Hindi-language films
Films directed by Aditya Sarpotdar